Michael Storm (born August 22, 1959) is an American former modern pentathlete. He competed at the 1984 Summer Olympics, winning a silver medal in the team event.  Storm graduated from the University of Pennsylvania in 1986 with a Bachelor of Arts degree and from Harvard Business School in 1989.

References

1959 births
Living people
American male modern pentathletes
Modern pentathletes at the 1984 Summer Olympics
Olympic silver medalists for the United States in modern pentathlon
Medalists at the 1984 Summer Olympics
Harvard Business School alumni
20th-century American people
21st-century American people